Price D. Rice (October 22, 1916 – February 21, 1999) was a U.S. Army Air Corps/U.S. Air Force officer and combat fighter pilot of the 332nd Fighter Group's 99th Fighter Squadron, best known as the Tuskegee Airmen. He was one of 1,007 documented Tuskegee Airmen Pilots.

Early life
Born on October 22, 1916, in Shelby, North Carolina, Cleveland County, Rice was raised in Montclair, N.J.

Though there is little information on Price's first wife, Price had four daughters with her: Delabian, Diana, Daphne, and Debra.

In 1962, Rice married Ohio State University alumnus and Howard University-trained physician Ellamae Simmons after meeting through a mutual friend. In 1964, Price and Simmons relocated from Ohio to the San Francisco Bay Area in California. In 1967, the couple purchased a home in San Francisco's exclusive Presidio Heights, becoming the first African American family there. In 1977, Rice and Simmons divorced.

Military career

Early 1942, Rice volunteered for service in the U.S. Army Air Corps. On October 9, 1942, Rice graduated from Tuskegee's cadet pilot training class 42-I-SE, receiving his wings and a commission as a 2nd Lieutenant.

After graduation, the U.S. Army Air Corps assigned Rice to the Tuskegee Airmen-99th Fighter Squadron where he flew patrol, strafing and bomber escort missions in World War II's Mediterranean and European Theater. Rice also served during Korea War and Vietnam War, retiring as a Colonel in 1965 after 23 years of active duty military service. He resided in the San Francisco Bay area until his death in 1999.

Awards
Congressional Gold Medal (2007)

Death
Rice died on February 21, 1999, from complications from diabetes. He was 82. He was interred at Arlington National Cemetery, Section 68, Grave 2255, in Arlington, Virginia.

See also
Tuskegee Airmen
List of Tuskegee Airmen Cadet Pilot Graduation Classes
List of Tuskegee Airmen
Military history of African Americans
 Dogfights (TV series)
 Executive Order 9981
 The Tuskegee Airmen (movie)

References

Notes

External links
 Fly (2009 play about the 332d Fighter Group)
Herman A. Lawson Black Eagles
Tuskegee Airmen at Tuskegee University
 Tuskegee Airmen Archives at the University of California, Riverside Libraries.
 Tuskegee Airmen, Inc.
 Tuskegee Airmen National Historic Site (U.S. National Park Service) 
 Tuskegee Airmen National Museum

1916 births
1999 deaths
Tuskegee Airmen
United States Army Air Forces officers
Military personnel from Tuskegee, Alabama
African-American aviators
People from Montclair, New Jersey
Military personnel from North Carolina
People from North Carolina
Military personnel from New Jersey